Aero Slovakia is an aviation company based in Slovakia offering a range of aviation services, including agriculture & forestry, patrolling & monitoring, photography and air taxi operations. The company has its head office on the grounds of Nitra Airport, Nitra.  The airline employs 20 staff, under the command of Lubomir Kovacik.

Fleet

The airline's fleet comprises 34 aircraft, including:

Antonov An-2
Cessna 150
Cessna 152
Cessna 172
Zlín Z37A "Čmelák"
Zlín Z137 Turbo
Zlín Z42
Zlín Z43

References

External links
Aero Slovakia
Aero Slovakia 

Airlines of Slovakia
Slovak brands
Slovakian companies established in 1992
Airlines established in 1992